The Awyu–Ok languages are a group of Trans–New Guinea families in central New Guinea established by Timothy Usher, though with precedents in earlier studies.

Languages
The three language families in Awyu–Ok are as follows:

Digul River (Greater Awyu)
Kamula–Elevala
Ok

The Oksapmin language is sometimes classified as the nearest relative of Ok. However, it's unclear whether the similarities are due to relationship or to contact between Oksapmin and Mountain Ok (or both).

Reconstruction

Phonemes
Usher (2020) reconstructs the consonant inventory as follows:

{| 
| *m || *n ||  ||  || 
|-
| *p || *t || *s || *k || *kʷ
|-
| *mb || *nd || *ndz || *ŋg || *ŋgʷ
|-
|  || *s ||  ||  || 
|-
| *w || *ɾ || *j ||  || 
|}

Pronouns
Usher (2020) reconstructs the pronouns as:
{| 
! !!sg!!pl
|-
!1excl
|rowspan=2|*ne||*nu
|-
!1incl
|*nup
|-
!2m
|*ŋgep
|rowspan=2|*ŋgip
|-
!2f
|*ŋgup
|-
!3m
|*eː
|rowspan=2|*i
|-
!3f
|*u
|}

The third-person pronouns are an innovation shared with the neighboring branch of Trans–New Guinea, Anim. The Awyu–Ok second-person pronouns show the same vowel ablaut for gender as well.

Basic vocabulary
Some lexical reconstructions of Proto-Digul River-Ok, Proto-Digul River, and Proto-Ok by Usher (2020) are:

{| class="wikitable sortable"
! gloss !! Proto-Digul River-Ok !! Proto-Digul River !! Proto-Ok
|-
! eye
| *kiːn(-roːp) || *kin-rop || *kiːn(-roːp)
|-
! mouth/tooth
| *maŋgoːt || *maŋgot || *maŋgoːt
|-
! tongue
| *poːŋg || *pon-kat || *poːŋg
|-
! blood/men's house
| *kaim || *kaim || *kaim
|-
! bone
| *kundoːR || *kundor || *kundoːR
|-
! skin/bark
| *kaːnd || *ka[ː]t || *kaːnd
|-
! breast
| *[aː/oː]m; *noːn || *[a/o]m; *non || 
|-
! dog
| *majaːn; *t[i/eː]nd || *m[a]jan; *t[i/e]t || *majaːn; *tind
|-
! egg
| *w[ai]ndin || *w[ai]ndin || *windin
|-
! sun/day
| *[a]taːp || *[a]ta[ː]p || *[a]taːp
|-
! moon
| *wakoːr || *wakor || *wakoːr
|-
! water
| *[aː/oː]k || *[a/o][ː]k || *oːk
|}

References

External links
Digul River-Ok. New Guinea World.
Digul River. New Guinea World.
Ok. New Guinea World.
Kamula-Elevala River. New Guinea World.
Central Ok. New Guinea World.
Lowland Ok. New Guinea World.
Mountain Ok. New Guinea World.

 
Central West New Guinea languages
Trans–New Guinea languages